Bujari is a municipality located in the northeast of the Brazilian state of Acre (state)  The estimated population in 2020 is 10,420.

References

Municipalities in Acre (state)